The twenty-second season of South Park, an American animated sitcom created by Trey Parker and Matt Stone, premiered on Comedy Central on September 26, 2018, and concluded on December 12, 2018, after 10 episodes aired. This season once again had planned "dark weeks" (weeks during which no new episodes would air) after episode four and episode seven.

Similar to the previous season, the season features continuing elements and recurring storylines without adhering to a linear story arc; while lampooning several phenomena such as school shootings in the United States, modern political correctness, climate change denial, and the working conditions and monopolistic tactics of Amazon, several characters in the show also express disdain and exasperation with South Park's constant attraction to controversy and surreal occurrences.

Marketing
On September 13, 2018, the series began teasing a set of commercials about a mock-cancellation by Comedy Central by using the hashtag #cancelsouthpark.

Episodes

Reception
The twenty-second season of South Park received positive reviews. On Rotten Tomatoes, the season holds a 77% approval rating based on 13 reviews, stating "South Park recaptures its sardonic magic in a less serialized season that remains hit-or-miss in its resonance but undeniably funny no matter who it skewers". 

The premiere episode "Dead Kids" was watched by 1.09 million viewers and scored a 0.7 in the ratings, making it the lowest watched season premiere in the show's history and a decrease from the season 21 premiere episode "White People Renovating Houses", which was watched by 1.68 million viewers.

Home media
This season was released in its entirety on DVD and Blu-ray on May 28, 2019.

References

2018 American television seasons